The 1923 Ontario general election was the 16th general election held in the Province of Ontario, Canada.  It was held on June 25, 1923, to elect the 111 Members of the 16th Legislative Assembly of Ontario ("MLAs").

The Ontario Conservative Party, led by George Howard Ferguson, was elected to power with a majority in the Legislature (although taking less than half the votes cast). 

This election ended the rule of the United Farmers of Ontario-Labour coalition government of Ernest C. Drury.

Campaign

Voter turnout
The election saw a voter turnout of just 54.7%, the lowest voter turnout in Ontario history until the 2007 election.

The low election turn-out was in part caused by the worst wind, rain and lightning storm in years inundating the western part of the province.  The electrical storm and hurricane began shortly after the polls closed, resulting in massive disruption of telegraph and telephone communications, which hampered the reporting of results.

Results
The 1923 election was plagued by low turn-out, and all the parties took fewer voters than they had in 1919.

The UFO actually took a larger proportion of the vote than it had in 1919 but took just a fraction of the seats it had taken in 1919 due to much of the anti-UFO vote concentrating behind Conservative Party candidates. The UFO had held power by virtue of a coalition with Labour and three other MLAs. Together they had received 34 percent of the votes cast in 1919. The Conservatives after the 1923 election took majority government based on taking 34 percent of the vote by that one party alone.

The Ontario Liberal Party, led by Wellington Hay, lost close to half its caucus in the Conservative landslide. Labour (the Independent Labour Party) too lost most of its MLAs in this turn-around election.

The Conservative party was the most popular, taking 34 percent of the vote. Its candidate was the leading one in a large proportion of the districts, giving it a large majority of seats in the legislature (more than its due proportionally) under the First past the post system in use at the time.

In the election, the UFO again did not run candidates where a Labour candidate was running - and also not in 20 other districts as well. The UFO received the third-most number of votes overall but only ran in about two-thirds of the districts so its vote count likely does not measure its actual support. Together Labour and the UFO ran in 93 seats so the two did not cover all the districts in the province.  

The UFO did not receive as many votes as it had in 1919 but still got fairly good numbers considering it did not run candidates in a third of the districts. As the 1923 election was plagued by low turn-out, the UFO received a higher percentage of votes cast than it had received in 1919. 

Prior to the election, the UFO government had introduced bills to re-distribute the ridings, and to introduce proportional representation and the single transferable vote, but withdrew them after vehement opposition from the Conservative MLAs, and it was found that even some government members were ambivalent. 

Under First past the post, the UFO received about a third of the seats that it was due proportionally overall. Looking at the 71 districts where the UFO ran candidates, it received about half the votes there so was due 35 of those seats but received only eight. In many districts, Conservative candidates took rural seats away from incumbent UFO MLAs by taking just a few hundred more votes than them in each district. In Prince Edward, Conservative candidate Horace Stanley Colliver took just 17 more votes than his closest contender to win the seat.

|-
! colspan=2 rowspan=2 | Political party
! rowspan=2 | Party leader
! colspan=5 | MPPs
! colspan=3 | Votes
|-
! Candidates
!1919
!Dissol.
!1923
!±
!#
!%
! ± (pp)

|style="text-align:left;"|Howard Ferguson
|103
|25
|24
|75
|50
|473,819
|49.77%
|15.68

|style="text-align:left;"|E.C. Drury
|71
|44
|44
|17
|27
|199,393
|20.94%
|0.03

|style="text-align:left;"|Wellington Hay
|78
|27
|27
|14
|13
|203,079
|21.33%
|4.18

|style="text-align:left;"|Walter Rollo
|23
|11
|11
|4
|7
|45,213
|4.75%
|4.34

|style="text-align:left;"|
|12
|–
|–
|1
|1
|15,426
|1.62%
|2.45

|style="text-align:left;"|
|2
|1
|1
|–
|1
|5,041
|0.53%
|0.08

|style="text-align:left;"|
|3
|–
|–
|–
|–
|10,122
|1.06%
|

|style="text-align:left;"|
|–
|1
|1
|–
|1
|colspan="3"|Did not campaign

|style="text-align:left;"|
|–
|1
|1
|–
|1
|colspan="3"|Did not campaign

|style="text-align:left;"|
|–
|1
|1
|–
|1
|colspan="3"|Did not campaign

|colspan="3"|
|1
|colspan="5"|
|-style="background:#E9E9E9;"
|colspan="3" style="text-align:left;"|Total
|292
|111
|111
|111
|
|952,093
|100.00%
|
|-
|colspan="8" style="text-align:left;"|Blank and invalid ballots
|align="right"|13,600
|style="background:#E9E9E9;" colspan="2"|
|-style="background:#E9E9E9;"
|colspan="8" style="text-align:left;"|Registered voters / turnout
|1,655,312
|58.34%
|27.19
|}

Regional analysis

MLAs elected

Italicized names indicate members returned by acclamation. Two-tone colour boxes indicate ridings that turned over from the 1919 election, eg, 

 Central Ontario

 Eastern Ontario

 Hamilton/Halton/Niagara

 Midwestern Ontario

 Northeastern Ontario

 Northwest Ontario

 Southwestern Ontario

 Toronto

 York/Peel/Ontario

Detailed analysis

Incumbents not running for reelection

Sixteen MLAs chose not to stand for re-election:

Seats that changed hands

There were 64 seats that changed allegiance in the election.

 UFO to Conservative
Carleton
Dufferin
Dundas
Durham East
Elgin East
Elgin West
Essex South
Grey South
Haldimand
Halton
Hastings East
Huron South
Lambton West
Lanark North
Lanark South
Middlesex North
Norfolk South
Northumberland East
Oxford South
Perth South
Peterborough East
Renfrew North
Simcoe Centre
Simcoe East
Simcoe South
Victoria North
Victoria South
Wellington West
Wentworth South

 UFO to Liberal
Essex North
Glengarry

 Liberal to Conservative
Brockville
Nipissing
Parry Sound
Perth North
Prince Edward
Stormont
Toronto Northwest - B
Toronto Southeast - A
Toronto Southeast - B
Toronto Southwest - A
Toronto Southwest - B
Welland
Windsor

 Liberal to UFO
Bruce South
Lincoln
Oxford North

 Liberal to Independent
Prescott

 Labour to Conservative
Fort William
Hamilton East
Hamilton West
Huron Centre
London
Niagara Falls
Peterborough West
Sault Ste. Marie
St. Catharines

 Independent-Liberal to Conservative
Waterloo North

 Farmer-Labour to Labour
Waterloo South

 Farmer-Liberal to UFO
Grey North

 Soldier to Conservative
Riverdale

 Conservative to Liberal
Lennox
Ottawa West

 Conservative to Labour
Rainy River

Notable groups of candidates

See also
Politics of Ontario
List of Ontario political parties
Premier of Ontario
Leader of the Opposition (Ontario)

Notes

References

Further reading
 

1923 elections in Canada
1923
1923 in Ontario
June 1923 events